The 1931–32 season was Chelsea Football Club's twenty-third competitive season. While the team's league form remained indifferent and they finished 12th for the second successive year, they did advance to the semi-finals of the FA Cup, where they lost to Newcastle United.

Table

References

External links
 1931–32 season at stamford-bridge.com

1931–32
English football clubs 1931–32 season